Lomm is a small village in the municipality of Venlo, the Netherlands 7 kilometres to the north of Venlo. There were 1,035 inhabitants in 2021.

References 

Boroughs of Venlo
Populated places in Limburg (Netherlands)